Dragon's Head may refer to,

Dragon's head, plants of the genus Dracocephalum
Dragon's head (Caput Draconis, or Anabibazon), the north lunar node used in astrology
Dragon's Head Nebula, an emissions nebula which is also known as NGC 2035.

See also
Dragon Head, a manga and a 2003 film
Dragonheads, an EP by the Finnish band Ensiferum
Caput Draconis (disambiguation), Latin for "dragon's head"